Cranagh  is a small village in County Tyrone, Northern Ireland. It is in the Glenelly Valley, about seven miles from Plumbridge In the 2001 Census it has a population of 60 people . It is within the Strabane District Council area

References 

Villages in County Tyrone